Meghan Walter (born February 22, 2002) is a Canadian curler. She is a former World Mixed Curling Champion.

Career

Juniors
Walter struggled to find success in her junior career, losing two U18 finals in a row (2018 and 2019), and two U21 titles. (2018 and 2019) She finally won a provincial U18 title in 2020, in her last year of eligibility. The 2020 Canadian U18 Curling Championships was cancelled due to the COVID-19 pandemic, so she never got to represent the province at the national level in U18. She did get to play in the 2021 World Junior Qualification Event, the event to qualify for the 2022 World Junior Curling Championships. There, her team of Lane Prokopowich, Katie McKenzie, and Mackenzie Elias went 3–3.

Mixed
Walter played third on the Colin Kurz rink that won the 2019 Canadian Mixed Curling Championship at home in Winnipeg, and won the 2019 World Mixed Curling Championship, making her the youngest ever world mixed champion. She was a Grade 12 student at Miles Macdonell Collegiate at the time. The World Curling Federation had only just recently lowered the minimum age to enter the event from 18.

Women's
While playing juniors, Walter also played at the women's level. She played third for Lisa Hale-Menard at the 2018 Manitoba Scotties Tournament of Hearts, where the rink went 2–5. Two years later, she was the alternate on the Beth Peterson rink at the 2020 Manitoba Scotties Tournament of Hearts. She continued to be the team's alternate the next season, participating in the 2021 Canadian Olympic Curling Pre-Trials. Walter and her junior rink of Prokopowich, McKenzie and Elias played in the 2022 Manitoba Scotties Tournament of Hearts, going 1–4 at the event. 

Walter joined the Team Abby Ackland women's rink in 2022, originally playing third on the team. Walter took over throwing fourth on the team of the Ackland rink part way through the season, and found immediate success, winning the 2022 DeKalb Superspiel.  
  The team made their first Grand Slam event at the 2023 Canadian Open, losing in the quarterfinal to Korea's Gim Eun-ji rink. Walter herself had already played in a Slam that season, as she spared for the Casey Scheidegger rink at the 2022 Masters, playing third on the team, which was skipped by Kate Hogan. The team went 2–3 at the event. 

The team played in the 2023 Manitoba Scotties Tournament of Hearts. They went 5-3 after pool play, then beat Beth Peterson in a tiebreaker, Kaitlyn Lawes in the semifinal, then lost to Jennifer Jones in the final. Despite the loss, the team still qualified for the 2023 Scotties Tournament of Hearts national championships, as a Wild Card entry.

Personal life
Walter is originally from the East Kildonan neighbourhood of Winnipeg. As of 2021, she was a science student at the University of Winnipeg.

References

Living people
2002 births
Canadian women curlers
Curlers from Winnipeg
University of Winnipeg alumni 
Canadian mixed curling champions
World mixed curling champions